Hirne is the name of several populated places in Ukraine.

 Hirne, Yalta municipality, a settlement in Crimea, currently disputed between Russia and Ukraine
 Hirne, Shakhtarsk municipality, a settlement in Donetsk Oblast, Ukraine
 Hirne, Khartsyzk municipality, an urban-type settlement in Donetsk Oblast, Ukraine
 Hirne, Krasnodon municipality, an urban-type settlement in Luhansk Oblast, Ukraine
 Hirne, Stryi Raion, a village in Lviv Oblast, Ukraine
 Hirne, Sumy Raion, a village in Sumy Oblast, Ukraine

See also
 Gorny (disambiguation)